Fabyan is a hamlet in central Alberta, Canada within the Municipal District of Wainwright No. 61. It is located near the Fabyan Trestle Bridge.

The community takes its name from Fabyan, New Hampshire.

Climate

Demographics 
The population of Fabyan according to the 2007 municipal census conducted by the Municipal District of Wainwright No. 61 is 100.

See also 
List of communities in Alberta
List of hamlets in Alberta

References 

Hamlets in Alberta
Municipal District of Wainwright No. 61